James Albanie (born 1 May 1968) is a South African cricketer. He played in one List A and ten first-class matches for Boland from 1995/96 to 1998/99.

See also
 List of Boland representative cricketers

References

External links
 

1968 births
Living people
South African cricketers
Boland cricketers
People from Breede Valley Local Municipality